The EFAF Challenge Cup was an international competition  for European American Football clubs. The EFAF Challenge Cup was the third highest level of club competition in the European Federation of American Football (EFAF), behind the European Football League (EFL) and the EFAF Cup.

EFAF Challenge Cup
Organised by EFAF, this competition is comparable to football's UI Cup.

Participants are Champions and Vice-Champions of the "smaller" American Football nations from eastern and southern Europe.

The competition was replaced by the IFAF CEI Interleague in 2011.

Competition format
In 2009, the group phase consisted of two groups with four teams each. The winners and the second placed of these groups qualify directly for the semi-final phase. From 2010, the competition will feature 12 teams, divided in 4 groups of 3. The group winners qualify for the semifinals.

Teams 2010

Group A 
 METU Falcons
 Istanbul Cavaliers
 Kraljevo Royal Crowns

Group B
 Győr Sharks
 ITU Tigers
 Klek Knights

Group C
 Bucharest Warriors
 Čačak Angel Warriors
 Boğaziçi Sultans

Group D
 Bologna Doves
 Zagreb Raiders
 Budapest Cowboys

Final

Teams 2009

Group A
 Pomorze Seahawks
 Győr Sharks
 Vrbas Hunters
 Klek Knights

Group B
 Devils Wrocław
 Hogs Reggio Emilia
 Pancevo Panthers
 Kragujevac Wild Boars

Final

External links
 EFAF Challenge Cup

American football competitions in Europe